Murature may refer to:

 Murature-class patrol ship, class of World War II era Argentine Navy warships
 ARA Murature (P-20), World War II era Argentine Navy warship
 José Luis Murature (1876–1929), Argentine foreign minister